The Charles Sutton Medal is an Australian rules football award presented annually to the player adjudged best and fairest for the Western Bulldogs throughout the Victorian Football League/Australian Football League season. The medal is named after 1950 winner Charlie Sutton, who was the Bulldogs' 1954 premiership captain-coach. There were many previous names for the medal, which was originally known as the McCarthy Trophy from 1927 to 1939, named after Con McCarthy, who played a key part in getting the club entry into the Victorian Football League. It was also called the Con Weickhardt trophy (also known as the Con Curtain trophy) from 1940 to 1954. It was named after the man who chaired the club for 4 years. It was renamed to its current name in 1955. The inaugural winner for the award was Ivan McAlpine in 1927.

The voting system as of the 2019 AFL season, consists of five members of the Western Bulldogs match committee awarding a score from zero to five for each player after every game. The maximum score that can be obtained after one game is 25. Five players have won the award while also winning the Brownlow Medal, the best and fairest award for the Australian Football League. Those players were Norman Ware (1941), John Schultz (1960), Gary Dempsey (1975), Kelvin Templeton (1980) and Scott Wynd (1992). Scott West holds the record for most Charles Sutton Medals at the club, winning the accolade seven times in ten years; 1995, 1997, 1998, 2000, 2003, 2004 and 2005. Gary Dempsey holds the second most, with a total of six. Dempsey also holds the record for most Charles Sutton Medals won consecutively, his streak running from 1973 to 1977, a total of five years.

Recipients

Multiple winners

References
General

Specific

Western Bulldogs
Australian Football League awards
Australian rules football-related lists